Ivomira Mihaylova (born 12 March 1990) is a Bulgarian judoka who competes in the +70 kg and +78 kg weight classes internationally, winning multiple medals at the IBSA European Judo Championships.

Career
Ivomira Mihaylova was born on 12 March 1990. At the 2009 International Blind Sports Federation European Judo Championships, she won the bronze medal in the +78 kg weight class. Mihaylova finished fifth in the women's +70 kg class at the IBSF Judo World Championships in 2010, held in Colorado Springs, Colorado.

She took part in the 2011 IBSA European Judo Championships, in Crawley, England. Mihaylova competed in two different weight classes, both the +70 kg and the +78 kg, winning the silver medal in the former and the gold medal in the latter. She was nominated for Bulgarian Disabled Athlete of the Year later in 2011, alongside Alexander Kenanov, Dechko Ovcharov, Ruzhdi Ruzhdi and Stela Eneva.

Mihaylova was selected for the Bulgarian team at the 2012 Summer Paralympics in London, England, in the women's +70 kg tournament. She reached the quarter finals, where she lost to eventual silver medallist Turkey's Nazan Akin through an ippon.

In 2015, Mihaylova was ranked ninth in the world in her weight class.

References

Living people
Bulgarian female judoka
Judoka at the 2012 Summer Paralympics
1990 births
21st-century Bulgarian women